

Thermal conductivity

Notes
 Ref. CRC: Values refer to 27 °C unless noted.
 Ref. CR2: Values refer to 300 K and a pressure of "100 kPa (1 bar)", or to the saturation vapor pressure if that is less than 100 kPa. The notation (P=0) denotes low pressure limiting values.
 Ref. LNG: Values refer to 300 K.
 Ref. WEL: Values refer to 25 °C.

References

CRC
As quoted from various sources in an online version of:
 David R. Lide (ed), CRC Handbook of Chemistry and Physics, 84th Edition. CRC Press. Boca Raton, Florida, 2003; Section 12, Properties of Solids; Thermal and Physical Properties of Pure Metals / Thermal Conductivity of Crystalline Dielectrics / Thermal Conductivity of Metals and Semiconductors as a Function of Temperature

CR2
As quoted from various sources in an online version of:
 David R. Lide (ed), CRC Handbook of Chemistry and Physics, 84th Edition. CRC Press. Boca Raton, Florida, 2003; Section 6, Fluid Properties; Thermal Conductivity of Gases

LNG
As quoted from this source in an online version of: J.A. Dean (ed), Lange's Handbook of Chemistry (15th Edition), McGraw-Hill, 1999; Section 4; Table 4.1, Electronic Configuration and Properties of the Elements
 Ho, C. Y., Powell, R. W., and Liley, P. E., J. Phys. Chem. Ref. Data 3:Suppl. 1 (1974)

WEL
As quoted at http://www.webelements.com/ from these sources:
 G.W.C. Kaye and T.H. Laby in Tables of physical and chemical constants, Longman, London, UK, 15th edition, 1993.
 D.R. Lide, (Ed.) in Chemical Rubber Company handbook of chemistry and physics, CRC Press, Boca Raton, Florida, USA, 79th edition, 1998.
 J.A. Dean (ed) in Lange's Handbook of Chemistry, McGraw-Hill, New York, USA, 14th edition, 1992.
 A.M. James and M.P. Lord in Macmillan's Chemical and Physical Data, Macmillan, London, UK, 1992.

See also
 List of thermal conductivities

Properties of chemical elements
Chemical element data pages